Arizona's 2nd congressional district is a congressional district located in the U.S. state of Arizona. After 2023, it is located in the northeast corner of the state. Before January 2023, it was located in the southeastern corner of the state and includes roughly two-thirds of Tucson.

District history
When Arizona was divided into congressional districts for the first time after the 1950 Census, the 2nd district comprised the entire state outside of the Phoenix area. Arizona gained a third district after the 1960 Census, and the 2nd was cut back to roughly the southern third of the state, stretching border-to-border from New Mexico to California. It ran along the entire length of the border with Mexico. By far the district's largest city was Tucson. The next largest city was Yuma, in the far west. After a mid-decade redistricting in 1967, the district was pushed slightly to the north, picking up a portion of southern Phoenix. This configuration remained largely unchanged until the 1980 Census, when much of eastern Tucson was drawn into the new 5th district.

The 2nd district remained based in southern Arizona until the 2000 Census, when Arizona picked up two districts. At that time, the old 2nd district essentially became the new 7th district, while most of the old 3rd district became the new 2nd district. Located in the northwestern corner of the state, it stretched into the western suburbs of Phoenix, known as the West Valley. It consisted of all of Peoria (within the exception of the portion of that city within Yavapai County) and Surprise, most of Glendale and much of western Phoenix in Maricopa County, all of Mohave County, and the Hopi Nation in Navajo and Coconino counties.

The size and diversity of the 2nd district (it included nearly all of the northwestern portion of the state) made it appear rural on a map. However, over 90 percent of its population lived in the strongly conservative West Valley, historically a fairly safe Republican area.

The odd shape of the district was indicative of the use of gerrymandering in its construction. The unusual division was not, however, drawn to favor politicians, but was due to historic tensions between the Hopi and the Navajo Native American tribes. Since tribal boundary disputes are a federal matter, it was long believed inappropriate to include both tribes' reservations in the same congressional district. However, the Hopi reservation is completely surrounded by the Navajo reservation. In order to comply with current Arizona redistricting laws, some means of connection was required that avoided including large portions of Navajo land, hence the narrow riverine connection.

George W. Bush carried the district in 2004 with 61% of the vote. John McCain won the district in 2008 with 60.75% of the vote while Barack Obama received 38.07%.

During the Super Tuesday, February 5, 2008 Arizona Democratic primary, the district was won by Hillary Clinton with 54.52% of the vote while Barack Obama received 35.62% and John Edwards took in 7.43%. In the Arizona Republican primary, the 2nd district was won by favorite son John McCain with 49.51% while Mitt Romney received 29.51% and Mike Huckabee took in 10.46% of the vote in the district.

After the 2012 census, the bulk of the Maricopa County portion of the old 2nd became the 8th district, while the new 2nd district took in most of the territory of the old 8th district. That district, in turn, had been the 5th district from 1983 to 2003.

In the 2014 midterms, the district was the last House of Representatives race to be decided, as the official recount began on December 1 due to Republican Martha McSally leading incumbent Democratic congressman Ron Barber by fewer than 200 votes. Ultimately, Barber lost to McSally by 167 votes.

In the 2018 midterms, McSally retired to run for the U.S. Senate, and Democrat Ann Kirkpatrick was easily elected to replace her. Following her defeat in the 2018 Senate race, McSally was appointed to the Class III U.S. Senate seat made vacant by the death of Senator John McCain.

History and demographics 
Athabaskan-speaking Native Americans lived in this region long before the arrival of the Europeans who established the Arizona Territory. In the late 19th century, Apache chief Cochise and a band of Chiricahuas built their stronghold on the Dragoon range of mountains. The tribe would often ambush and rob passersby as an attempt to keep interlopers off their land. The presence of the tribe deterred the settlement of the area for far longer than the rest of the Arizona Territory.  The district, containing a county now called by his name, developed when its varied and valuable resources were found in the 1870s. The discovery of silver mines in 1878 in the Tombstone district spurred much growth and investment in the area.

Geography 
The district is covered by mountains and wide valleys. The district is high desert grasslands with elevations from 3500 to 6000 feet. Several mountain ranges run through the district with the highest peak in the Chiricahua Mountains at 9,796 feet. Southeast Arizona is at an ecological crossroads where habitats and species from the Sierra Madre of Mexico, the Rocky Mountains, and the Sonoran and Chihuahuan deserts can all be found. The abrupt rise of mountains from the surrounding grasslands creates unique habitats harboring rare species and communities of plants and animals. The area has a semi-arid climate with moderate winters and hot summers. Precipitation rarely exceeds one inch in any month other than July, August, and September, when high intensity, but short-lived monsoon storms can occur.

Main industries
Primary job fields of the people in the district include agriculture, ranching, livestock, mining, and tourism. The main irrigated crops are cotton, wheat, corn, grain, sorghum, alfalfa, hay, apples, peaches, cherries, grapes, pistachios, pecans, lettuce, chilis, and other vegetables. The area has a multitude of U-pick vegetable farms and orchards, including several organic farms. Greenhouse tomato and cucumber operations have been completed in the past few years with much success. In Cochise County there is the U.S. Army base Fort Huachuca and numerous military-industrial companies. In suburban and urban areas, Wal-Marts are the most abundant superstores.

Schools
Located within the district is Cochise College, a two-year college. The University of Arizona is located within a couple miles of the district border, located in central Tucson. Approximately 2.8% of adults 25 and older have completed education lower than 9th grade; 5.5% have completed education between 9th and 12th grade but have not received a diploma; 17.9% are high school graduates; 26.8% have some college but no degree; 7.5% have an associate degree; 26.1% have a bachelor's degree; and 13.5% have a graduate or professional degree.

Tourism and recreation
Tourism is an important industry as the district has numerous natural wonders, national forests, parks, and conservation areas. There are multiple caverns (including the renowned Kartchner Caverns) and canyons available for visitation. Hiking, camping, fishing, and boating can be found throughout the region. There are also Apache historical sites, war memorials, museums, tour trains, and mine tours. Golfing is popular, and multiple golf courses are located through the district.

Voting

List of members representing the district 
Starting with the 1948 elections, Arizona began using separate districts to elect its members to the House of Representatives rather than using a general ticket due to having gained a second seat in the House with the data from 1940 Census.

Recent election results

2002

2004

2006

2008

2010

2012

2014

2016

2018

2020

2022

See also

 Arizona's congressional districts
 List of United States congressional districts

References

External links
 Maps of Congressional Districts first in effect for the 2002 election
 Tentative Final Congressional Maps for the 2012 election
 Demographic data from census.gov
 2004 Election data from CNN.com
 2002 Election data from CBSNews.com
 2000 Election data from CNN.com
 1998 Election data from CNN.com
 full listing of candidates, via Arizona Secretary of State's office
 

02
Government of Cochise County, Arizona
Government of Pima County, Arizona
Government of Santa Cruz County, Arizona
Government of Tucson, Arizona
Constituencies established in 1949
1949 establishments in Arizona